Darko Marić (born 2 September 1975 in Belgrade) is a retired Serbian football player who last played as a forward for FC Brașov.

On 8 May 2005 he suffered a head injury during the First Division match between FC Brașov and FC Argeş, when he collided with Marius Radu, needing to be transported by ambulance to the hospital. The collision was however involuntary.

After the retirement as a professional player, he opened up a football agency in Serbia named D.M.management. He was also director of BSK Borča.
One of notable players of D.M.management is Andrew Mwesigwa, Uganda national team captain, player of Kazakhstan club, FC Ordabasy.

References

1975 births
Living people
Serbian footballers
Serbian expatriate footballers
FK Bor players
OFK Beograd players
ES Viry-Châtillon players
FK Napredak Kruševac players
Anagennisi Deryneia FC players
FC Brașov (1936) players
Cypriot First Division players
Expatriate footballers in Cyprus
Expatriate footballers in Romania
Association football forwards